Boronia tenuior is a species of flowering plant that is endemic to Western Australia. It is an open shrub with thin, square stems, simple, serrated leaves, and pink to mauve, four-petalled flowers.

Description
The branchlets are more or less square in outline with a narrow, wavy, glandular wing on each corner. The flowers are arranged in cymes on the ends of the branchlets with large, red bracts at the base. There are eight stamens with a warty tip and hairy. Flowering mainly occurs between October and January.<ref name="ABRS">{{cite web |last1=Duretto |first1=Marco F. |last2=Wilson |first2=Paul G. |last3=Ladiges |first3=Pauline Y. |title=Boronia tenuior |url=https://profiles.ala.org.au/opus/foa/profile/Boronia%20keysii |publisher=Australian Biological Resources Study, Department of the Environment and Energy, Canberra |accessdate=8 May 2019}}</ref>

Taxonomy and namingBoronia tenuior was first formally described in 1923 by Karel Domin from specimens collected by Arthur Dorrien-Smith. The description was published in the journal Vestnik Kralovske Ceske Spolecnosti Nauk, Trida Matematiko-Prirodevedecke. The specific epithet (tenuior) is derived from the Latin word tenuis meaning "thin".

Distribution and habitat
This boronia grows near swamps, along streams, along roads and in seasonally wet places between Busselton, Augusta, Nannup and Walpole.

ConservationBoronia tenuior'' is classified as "not threatened" by the Western Australian Government Department of Parks and Wildlife.

References 

tenuior
Flora of Western Australia
Plants described in 1923
Taxa named by Karel Domin